Culex (Culiciomyia) pallidothorax is a species of mosquito belonging to the genus Culex. It is found in Bangladesh, Cambodia, China, Hong Kong, India, Indonesia, Japan, Macau, Malaysia, Myanmar, Nepal, Philippines, Irian Jaya, Maluku, Ryukyu, Sri Lanka, Thailand, Taiwan, Timor, and Vietnam.

References

External links 
Breeding habitats of mosquitoes in Goa.

pallidothorax
Insects described in 1905